Alternative is a compilation album by English synth-pop duo Pet Shop Boys. It was released on 7 August 1995 by Parlophone.

Alternative is a two-disc set, consisting of 30 B-sides in chronological order. The title Alternative was a last-minute change from the title that had been long saved for such an album, Besides, but that title was taken by American rock band Sugar, who released their own B-sides compilation two months prior.

A remake of the original 7-inch "Paninaro", titled "Paninaro '95", was released as a single (which was included on the later PopArt: The Hits set) to promote the two-disc compilation which reached number two in the UK Albums Chart.

The cover of Alternative features photographs of Tennant and Lowe in fencing masks. The first copies of the CD have a lenticular image on the cover which shifts between the two photographs.

Neil Tennant revealed in a radio interview with Absolute Radio that a second B-side album may be released in 2010. On 11 November 2011, the duo announced through Varsity that they would release another B-sides album in February 2012, titled Format.

Track listing

Personnel
Neil Tennant
Chris Lowe

Producers
Pet Shop Boys – all tracks except disc 1: track 13
Phil Harding – disc 1: track 1
Bobby O – disc 1: track 2
Shep Pettibone – disc 1: track 7, additional production on disc 1: track 4
David Jacob – disc 1: track 8
Trevor Horn and Stephen Lipson – disc 1: track 13
Harold Faltermeyer – disc 2: track 6
Stephen Hague – additional production on disc 2: tracks 7 and 9
Jonathon Ruffle – disc 2: track 8
Richard Niles – disc 2: track 13

Guest musicians
Blue Weaver – Fairlight programming on disc 1: tracks 1 and 11, Hammond organ on disc 1: track 11
Adrien Cook – Fairlight programming on disc 1: tracks 5, 6 and 7
Helena Springs – additional vocals on disc 1: track 7
Stephen Lipson – guitar on disc 1: track 11
Shirley Lewis and Dee Lewis – additional vocals on disc 1: track 11
Chris Newman – assistant Fairlight programming on disc 1: track 12, additional programming on disc 2: track 4
Juliet Roberts – additional vocals on disc 2: track 2
Dominic Clarke – programming on disc 2: tracks 2 and 3
Gary Maughan – additional keyboards on disc 2: track 3
Scott Davidson – programming on disc 2: track 5
Harold Faltermeyer – programming on disc 2: track 6
Pete Gleadall – programming on disc 2: tracks 7, 9, 10, 11, 12, 14 and 15
Richard Coles – additional keyboards on disc 2: track 8
Carol Kenyon, Katie Kissoon and Tessa Niles – additional vocals on disc 2: track 9
Bruce Woolley – additional vocals on disc 2: track 10
J.J. Belle – guitar on disc 2: track 11
Sylvia Mason-James – additional vocals on disc 2: track 11
Johnny Marr – guitar on disc 2: track 12
Frank Ricotti – percussion and vibraphone on disc 2: track 12
Richard Niles – string arrangement and conduction on disc 2: track 12, arrangement and conduction on disc 2: track 13
Tony Walthers, Daniel Gaha & Lance Ellington – backing vocals on disc 2: track 13
Gerard Presencer – trumpet solo on disc 2: track 13

Charts

Certifications and sales

References

1995 compilation albums
B-side compilation albums
Parlophone compilation albums
Pet Shop Boys compilation albums